Asaphodes prymnaea is a moth in the family Geometridae. It is endemic to New Zealand and can be found on the Mount Arthur tableland. It is common in limestone valleys. The female of the species is paler and has less distinctive markings than the male. Adults are on the wing in January and February.

Taxonomy 
This species was first described by Edward Meyrick in 1911, using specimens collected by George Hudson in February at the Mount Arthur tableland at altitudes of between 3,600 - 4,200 ft, and named Xanthorhoe prymnaea. George Hudson discussed and illustrated this species under that name in his 1928 publication The butterflies and moths of New Zealand. In 1971 J. S. Dugdale placed this species in the genus Asaphodes. This placement was confirmed by Dugdale in 1988. The male lectotype, collected at Mount Arthur, is held by the Natural History Museum, London.

Description

Meyrick described this species as follows:
The female has paler and less distinctive markings.

Distribution
This species is endemic to New Zealand and can be found in the Mount Arthur tableland.

Habitat 
This species is said to be common in limestone valleys.

Behaviour 
Adults of this species are on the wing in January and February.

References 

Moths described in 1911
Moths of New Zealand
Larentiinae
Endemic fauna of New Zealand
Taxa named by Edward Meyrick
Endemic moths of New Zealand